Nyzhnia Krynka is an urban-type settlement in Makiivka Municipality (district) in Donetsk Oblast of eastern Ukraine. Population:

Demographics
Native language as of the Ukrainian Census of 2001:
 Ukrainian 33.29%
 Russian 65.96%
 Belarusian 0.2%
 Moldovan (Romanian) 0.04%
 Bulgarian, Armenian, Polish, and Romani 0.01%

References

Urban-type settlements in Donetsk Raion